JTE 7-31 is a selective cannabinoid receptor agonist invented by Japan Tobacco. It is a reasonably highly selective CB2 agonist, but still retains appreciable affinity at CB1, with a Ki of 0.088nM at CB2 vs 11nM at CB1.

Legality
JTE 7-31 is illegal in Alabama.

See also
 A-834,735
 JTE-907
 MDA-19
 N-(S)-Fenchyl-1-(2-morpholinoethyl)-7-methoxyindole-3-carboxamide
 S-444,823
 XLR-12

References

External links

Cannabinoids
Japan Tobacco